The Marcílio Dias-class destroyer is a class of destroyers of the Brazilian Navy.

Development and design 

The propulsion system and auxiliary equipment consisted of three GE turbines, high pressure cruise and low pressure with reverse gear; 60,000 HP of total power, Falk double reduction gears, which drove two laminated steel propellers, four blades, 4.86 m in diameter; maximum speed 33 knots; maximum speed maintained 30 knots; economic speed 10 knots; 1,746 miles of range at maximum maintained speed; 6,267 miles at economy speed; two electro-hydraulic vertical rudders; driven by Waterbury pumps and by a 3SHP electric motor, 440 volts, three-phase, 60 cycles, governed from the bridge via a tiller, from the helm machine via a wheel and from the helm machine, directly actuating the piston control rod the Waterbury pump.

Four Babcock & Wilcox delta type express boilers with economizer and integral interbeam superheater, with superheat degree control up to 850°F; two GE turbogenerators, 500 kW, 440 volts, 60 cycles, three-phase and 50 kW, direct current 117 volts; two diesel emergency generators GM, 100 Kw, 440 volts, 60 cycles, three-phase; a high-pressure, 3,000 psi, vertical turbocharger; two Consolidate Steel Corp. distillation groups, 12,000 gallons/day and 4,000 gallons/day; 718 t of fuel oil capacity; 7,025 gallons, 6,048 liters of lubricating oil capacity.

In addition to several conventional communications equipment (transmitters, transceivers and receivers), they had: AN/SPS-10D surface-search radar; AN/SPS-40 air-search radar and Mark 25 fire-direction radar. AN/SQS-23F sonar; AN UQC underwater phone equipment; active and passive electronic warfare equipment AN/ULQ-6, CNE WLRI and MAGE.

For navigation, they had: radio direction finding device JLD-1000 Direction Finder; Sperry MKll gyro needle, model c; Lionel-13495 MKl magnetic needle; Lionel 3344MK magnetic needle (government); ET/SON-3v-Coester SA echo sounder; equipment for Omega navigation, in addition to nautical instruments necessary for astronomical and coastal navigation.

On 18 April 1975, with the Marcílio Dias was anchored in Guanabara Bay, a Westland Wasp helicopter landed on board a destroyer for the first time.

Ships in the class

References 

Destroyer classes
Marcilio Dias-class destroyers
Destroyers of the Cold War